Heading West is a 1946 American Western film directed by Ray Nazarro and written by Ed Earl Repp. The film stars Charles Starrett, Doris Houck, Hank Penny and Smiley Burnette. The film was released on August 15, 1946, by Columbia Pictures.

Plot

Cast          
 Charles Starrett as Steve Randall / The Durango Kid
 Doris Houck as Anne Parker
 Hank Penny as Guitar Player
 Smiley Burnette as Smiley Burnette
 Nolan Leary as Sam Parker
 Norman Willis as Rance Hudson
 Bud Geary as Blaze Curlew
 Wally Wales as Jim Mallory
 Tommy Coats as Carter
 Frank McCarroll as Red Curlew
 Stanley Price as Henchy
 Tom Chatterton as Doctor
 John Merton as Kelso

References

External links
 

1946 films
1946 Western (genre) films
American Western (genre) films
American black-and-white films
Columbia Pictures films
1940s English-language films
Films directed by Ray Nazarro
1940s American films